Ozodes infuscatus is a species of beetle in the family Cerambycidae. It was described by H. W. Bates in 1870.

References

Necydalopsini
Beetles described in 1870
Taxa named by Henry Walter Bates